Zimyanskiy Aerodrome (formerly Beketovsk, Beketowskaja, Deketovskaya, or Beketovka) is a small aerodrome located approximately  southwest Volgograd, Volgograd Oblast, Russia.

History 

From 1951 through 1997, the aerodrome was used by the Russian Air Force (and predecessor Soviet Air Forces) as a training base and was home to the 706th Training Aviation Regiment. More advanced L-39 Albatros aircraft were acquired in the 1980s and the unit was reported as operating 89 of them in 1990 along with 84 of the original L-29 fleet. The latter would be withdrawn in 1992, but the L-39 would continue with the 706th until the unit was disbanded in 1997.

The airfield's existence pre-dated World War II, and while German forces briefly occupied the airfield during the German Case Blue offensive, there is no record of it being used by the Luftwaffe.

References

Russian Air Force bases
Soviet Air Force bases